Asakawa (written: 朝河 or 浅川) is a Japanese surname. Notable people with the surname include:

Asakawa brothers (1884–1964) (1891–1931), Japanese academics
Kan'ichi Asakawa (1873–1948), Japanese academic and historian
Maki Asakawa (1942–2010), Japanese jazz singer and composer
Yū Asakawa (born 1975), Japanese voice actress

See also
Asakawa, Fukushima, town in Japan
Asakawa Station, train station in Tokushima Prefecture, Japan

Japanese-language surnames